Tilikratis Football Club, also known as AO Tilikratis Lefkada is a Greek association football club based on the island of Lefkada (Lefkas), Greece.
Τηλυκράτης is the highest placed soccer team from the Greek island of Lefkada.  they played in Group 5 of Delta Ethniki and, a few days before the end of the season 2010–11, they won the group to go on to compete in Football League 2 for the 2011–12 season.

Name
The name of Tilikratis ("the man who holds a long spear") is owned Telycrates a Lefkaditis master (here the historian Pan. Rontogiannis puts question mark over whether it was master) who particularly excelled in the battle of Aegospotami (end of August 405 BC) which finally destroyed the Athenian power. In Tilykrati depicting one of those glorious statues of "Admiral", which we set up the winner in the battle at Delphi (Pausanias 10.9,4): "That being Lacedaemonians and apantikry offerings Estin on Athens Dioscuri and Zeus and Apollo and tech Artemis.

History
The first club in Lefkada founded in 1925 by students of the school and had the name "Sappho" (lasted until 1926). By LD 1926 established the National Directorate of Physical Education (DEFA). So was the prefects the right to establish associations of National Physical Education (SEFA). Based on this LD was Lefkas (Preveza Prefecture from) the National Association of Physical Education 'the Tilykratis' (creation date 5.3.1927).
The first 'Tilykratis' was the only SEFA and was the National Association of Physical Education, originally part of sports athletics, football, etc. sports section and picnic and swimming. The first Board of the Tilykrati were: Christ. Lazaris, Anast. Manoudis, John Stamatelos, Thrasyvoulos Aravanis and Takis Kaliviotis. The activity of the association beginning in 1928 with the first trainer in Santa Eustatius. Periodically in the coming years established a number of other clubs who then merged into Tilykrati. It is for the colors blue and red, representing two great loves of Agiomafriton. The blue and red Greece football. The jerseys, on the left side there are caps TL meant Tilykratis Lefkada.

The long path Tilykrati things in football and had some swings for the team. In 1963 to represent the football Lefkada larger groups (especially in the second National) Tilykratis merged with the second large group of Lefkada, the White (founded 1951), and made the Pallefkadio. The dictatorial regime of militarists gave the club the name "Phoenix" Lefkada. In the early days of the junta in 1974, the team took back her real name, Tilykratis, which makes its way to success. This year (2009) struggles with success in the Fourth National, namely the Regional Championships (Group 5).The crowning moment in the history of 82chroni Tilykrati (apart from winning the World Cup in the region of Epirus) was an attempt in 1975 to found the Second National-business-class. March 20, 1975-as a champion of South-Continent Group began Gytheio grading matches for the Second National category. There he won 2-1 in Pangytheiako.

Established in 1927 as Tylikratis.
In 1963 Pallefkadios was established after a merger of Tylikratis and Lefkata (est. 1951).
In 1968 Pallefkadios was renamed to Finikas Lefkadas.
In 1974 Renamed again to A.O. Tylikratis. The name Tylikratis = The Man who holds a long Speer.

Players

Current squad

Club rivalries
Tylikratis's longest rivalry is with nearby Preveza FC, the two teams have clashed many times over the years and any success against their rivals is always sweet. Lefkada is part of the Ionian islands and being a smaller island than Corfu, any success against A.O. Kerkyra creates understandable anxiety among their northern neighbours.

External links
 Official Tilikratis FC Website
 Official D DIVISION 5TH SECTION Website

 
Football clubs in the Ionian Islands (region)
1927 establishments in Greece
Gamma Ethniki clubs
Association football clubs established in 1927